Abildaev is a Russian and Kazakh surname. Notable people with the surname include:

Askar Abildaev (born 1971), Kazakh footballer
Sultan Abildayev (born 1970), Kazakh footballer

Russian-language surnames
Kazakh-language surnames